Montalto is the highest peak of the Aspromonte, a massif in southern Calabria in southern Italy. It is part of the Aspromonte National Park.

See also
 List of European ultra prominent peaks

References

External links
 "Montalto, Italy" on Peakbagger

Mountains of Calabria